Of Mice and Men is a 1937 novella by John Steinbeck.

Of Mice and Men may also refer to:

 Phrase from the poem "To a Mouse" by Robert Burns
 Of Mice and Men (play), 1937 play by John Steinbeck based on his novel
 Of Mice and Men (1939 film), based on the novel by John Steinbeck
 Of Mice and Men (1968 film), television film based on the novel
 Of Mice and Men (1981 film), made-for-television film featuring Whitman Mayo
 Of Mice and Men (1992 film), third movie adaptation of John Steinbeck's novel
 Of Mice & Men (band), a metalcore band from California
 Of Mice & Men (album), the 2010 self-titled debut album by the band
 Of Mice and Men (opera), by American composer Carlisle Floyd
 "Of Mice and Men" (song), by the band Megadeth from the 2004 album The System Has Failed